Entrainment in the biomusicological sense refers to the synchronization (e.g. foot tapping) of organisms to an external perceived rhythm such as human music and dance.  Humans are the only species for which all individuals experience entrainment, although there are documented examples of entrained nonhuman individuals.

Beat induction
Beat induction is the process in which a regular isochronous pulse is activated while one listens to music (i.e. the beat to which one would tap one's foot). It was thought that the cognitive mechanism that allows us to infer a beat from a sound pattern, and to synchronize or dance to it, was uniquely human. No primate tested so far—with exception of the human species—can dance or collaboratively clap to the beat of the music. Humans know when to start, when to stop, when to speed up or to slow down, in synchronizing with their fellow dancers or musicians. Although primates do not appear to display beat induction, some parrots do. The most famous example, Snowball was shown to display genuine dance, including changing his movements to a change in tempo (Patel et al., 2009)

Beat induction can be seen as a fundamental cognitive skill that allows for music (e.g., Patel, 2008; Honing, 2007; 2012). We can hear a pulse in a rhythmic pattern while it might not even be explicitly in there: The pulse is being induced (hence the name) while listening—like a perspective can be induced by looking at an arrangement of objects in a picture.

Neuroscientist Ani Patel proposes beat induction—referring to it as "beat-based rhythm processing"—as a key area in music-language research, suggesting beat induction "a fundamental aspect of music cognition that is not a byproduct of cognitive mechanisms that also serve other, more clearly adaptive, domains (e.g. auditory scene analysis or language)" (Patel, 2008).

Evolutionary function
Joseph Jordania recently suggested that the human ability to be entrained was developed by the forces of natural selection as an important part of achieving the specific altered state of consciousness, battle trance. Achieving this state, in which humans lose their individuality, do not feel fear and pain, are united in a shared collective identity, and act in the best interests of the group, was crucial for the physical survival of our ancestors against the big African predators, after hominids descended from the safer trees to the dangerous ground and became terrestrial.

Biological neuron model

In addition to transmitting signals to other parts of the brain, neurons can modify the rules which neighboring neurons to in a process called biological synchronization. The figure to the right illustrates entrainment between finger motion of the left and right hands, but only if the motion of both hands are moving in the same direction.  To illustrate this, begin by slowly moving the index fingers slowly in an anti-phase manner, as shown in the bottom portion of the figure. Then, gradually increase the frequency to make the motion as rapid as possible.  Eventually your fingers will be moving in phase, as shown in the top portion of the figure. It has been proposed that this behavior resembles the process by which neurons create a phase-locked loop that permits recognition of consonant musical intervals.

See also
Choir
Evolutionary musicology
Music therapy
Unison
Zoomusicology
Restless legs syndrome

References

Further reading

 

 Patel, A. (2008). "Beat-based rhythm processing as a key research area", In Music, Language and the Brain (pp. 402–415). Oxford: Oxford University Press.
 Desain, P., & Honing, H. (1994). "Foot-Tapping: a brief introduction to beat induction". In Proceedings of the 1994 International Computer Music Conference. 78-79. San Francisco: International Computer Music Association.

External links
 Patel (2008).
 Newborn infants detect the beat in music.

Biology terminology
Music cognition
Music psychology
Rhythm and meter